Hussain Kuwajerwala (born 12 October 1977) is an Indian television actor, host and model. After several modelling campaigns and commercials, Kuwajerwala landed a role in the  popular soap opera  Kyunki Saas Bhi Kabhi Bahu Thi which was followed by a lead role in  Kumkum - Ek Pyaara Sa Bandhan as Sumeet Wadhwa opposite Juhi Parmar (2002-2009). He also hosted several shows including Shabaash India, Kisme Kitna Hai Dum, Kuch Kar Dikhana Hai, Khullja Sim Sim, Indian Idol and Dance Premier League. He is the winner of Nach Baliye 2 and also participated in Fear Factor: Khatron Ke Khiladi 6. Kuwajerwala made his Bollywood debut in 2013 with the film Shree. He made his television comeback after 8 years with the comedy show Sajan Re Phir Jhoot Mat Bolo (2017-2018) as Jaiveer Chopra. Hussain is also popular for his fitness tips and lifestyle status apart from his good looks and charming physique.

Television

Theatre

 Zangoora - The Gypsy Prince

Films

 2013 - Shree as Shree

Awards and nominations 
Indian Telly Awards

 2007 Style Icon of the Year Award
Indian Television Academy Awards
 2007 Best Actor in a lead role (Popular)- Sumit Wadhwa- Kumkum – Ek Pyara Sa Bandhan(Nominated)
 2018 Leading Star Male(Popular) -Jaiveer Chopra- Sajan Re Phir Jhoot Mat Bolo (Nominated)
 2018 Best Actor Comedy (Jury)-Jaiveer Chopra- Sajan Re Phir Jhoot Mat Bolo(Nominated)

See also 

 List of Indian television actors

References

External links

Living people
Indian male television actors
Indian male film actors
Dawoodi Bohras
Indian male musical theatre actors
Male actors from Mumbai
Nach Baliye winners
1967 births
Indian game show hosts
Fear Factor: Khatron Ke Khiladi participants